Binnie Time is an Australian television series, which aired on Melbourne station GTV-9 from . The 15-minute weekly daytime series was originally aired on Thursdays, but the last few episodes were broadcast on Fridays.

It is not known if the show was live or kinescoped in advance. The archival status of the series is not known.

Hosted by Binnie Lum, the series was a musical quiz show.

Some episodes featured celebrity guests. For example, Winifred Atwell appeared as a guest in the 30 October 1958 episode, while Corinne Kerby appeared as a guest in the 18 December 1958 episode.

Binnie Lum, who later went by the name Binny Lum, had previously been a host on Thursday at One.

References

External links

Nine Network original programming
1950s Australian game shows
Black-and-white Australian television shows
English-language television shows
1958 Australian television series debuts
1959 Australian television series endings